Kanzhongguo, also known as Vision Times, is a Falun Gong-affiliated Chinese language weekly newspaper. It was founded in 2001 as a website, www.secretchina.com. In 2006, it began publishing weekly print versions in major U.S. cities and Australia (as Vision China Times) where large Chinese communities exist. In 2007, print versions were launched in Europe.

Affiliations 
The Hoover Institution's 2018 survey of Chinese language media landscape in the United States said, "The space for truly independent Chinese-language media in the United States has shrunk to a few media outlets supported by the adherents of Falun Gong, the banned religious sect in China, and a small publication and website called Vision Times. The publisher of the New York edition, Peter Wang, told the Hoover Institution in 2018 that while some of the staff of the paper may be Falun Gong adherents, the paper is not a Falun Gong operation. He also said that the was Vision Times "was formed expressly to address the issue of the shrinking space for independent Chinese voices in the United States" and that "[s]ince then, it has focused on two areas – human rights reporting and traditional Chinese culture."

Vision Times is one of the news organizations that Falun Gong's founder Li Hongzhi refers to as "our media". The newspaper's president is the spokesperson for the Falun Dafa Association in New York, and is chair of another Falun Gong group called Quit the CCP. In 2020, ABC's Background Briefing confirmed Vision Times as a Falun Gong publication through testimonies of ex-practitioners and emails of Falun Gong members. In 2021, The Atlantic called Vision Times a "doppelgänger site" of The Epoch Times. In the same year, David Brophy wrote that Vision Times''' general manager is part of the Australian Government's Department of Foreign Affairs and Trade's National Foundation for Australia-China Relations.

According to Semafor, the Youtube channel China Insights is affiliated with Vision Times.

Criticism
Some China experts such as David Brophy from Sydney University have questioned Vision Times' editorial independence from Falun Gong.

Some example reporting included:
 Vision Times reported that doctors recovered from coronavirus by reciting the nine sacred words of Falun Gong, which Brophy described as being presented as fact.
 Vision Times also reported that Chinese political leaders were interested in consuming human brains. Brophy described the question of the organization's relationship to Falun Gong as clearly present.

 See also 
 Vision China Times''

References

Bibliography

External links 
 
 

Chinese-language newspapers